Umeh Charles Sobechukwu, professionally credited as Sobe Charles Umeh is a Nigerian-Canadian film and tv director and producer, best known for the films Sorelle, Black Vision and Bad Drop, as well as the 2017 Africa Magic Viewers Choice (AMVCA) winning movie Amonye Bu Onye.

Early life 
Sobe was born in Enugu, Southeast Nigeria, He is the last of six children.

Personal life
In 2014, Umeh married Isioma Concilia, with whom he subsequently moved to Regina, Saskatchewan, Canada.

Career
Sobe started his filmmaking journey in 2015 when he co-produced his first feature length film Bad Drop with Actor Producer Stan Nze, which also served as his feature length Directorial Debut. The film went ahead to win 2 awards and many nominations.

Filmography

References 

Living people
Nigerian film producers
Year of birth missing (living people)
Nigerian emigrants to Canada
Nigerian film directors
Film producers from Saskatchewan
Film directors from Saskatchewan
Black Canadian filmmakers
Igbo people
People from Enugu State
Nigerian television directors